Antoinette Cherish Flores Taus (born August 30, 1981) is a Filipino-American television/movie/theater actress, singer, host, commercial model, UNEP Goodwill Ambassador  and Founder of a non-profit called CORA Philippines.

Taus formerly worked as an exclusive talent of ABS-CBN from 1992 to 1997 and GMA Network from 1997 to 2004. She is the older sister of former child star now currently a DJ and TV Host, Tom Taus. She achieved fame as a teen actress in the 1990s for her portrayals of Anna Karenina "Anna" Serrano in Anna Karenina and as Bianca de Jesus in T.G.I.S., which she was first paired with Dingdong Dantes. Taus famously hosted the Philippine coverage of BBC Millennium Celebration 2000 Today, which was broadcast over 67 countries around the world. She spent ten years living in Los Angeles. She recently has returned to the Philippines to resume her career.

Aside from her showbiz stints, she is actively part of humanitarian works and serves as an advocate in various campaigns about climate change and mental health.

Filmography

Television

Films

Theatre

 The Wizard of Oz
 I Ought to be in Pictures
 Les Misérables (as Gavroche)
 The Little Mermaid at the Ayala Center (2003)
 Grease The Musical (as Betty Rizzo, 2014)
 Bituing Walang Ninging The Musical (as Lavinia Arguelles, 2015)

Discography

Album

Single

Philanthropy
Aside from her stints on television, she is currently active on advocating Sustainable Development Goals, and Mental Health in the Philippines. She founded an organization named CORA (Communities Organized for Resource Allocation) that aims to help the need especially the poor, and to raise awareness and take actions against environmental problems like climate change.) On September 26, 2019, Antoinette Taus was hailed as National Goodwill Ambassador for the Philippines by UN Environment Programme to continually promote sustainability and environmental protection.

Footnotes

References

External links
 

1981 births
Living people
Ateneo de Manila University alumni
Filipino child actresses
Filipino people of American descent
21st-century Filipino women singers
Viva Artists Agency
Viva Records (Philippines) artists
ABS-CBN personalities
Star Magic
GMA Network personalities
Filipino musical theatre actresses
Filipino Roman Catholics
Kapampangan people
People from Angeles City
Actresses from Pampanga
Singers from Pampanga